Kazimar Periya Pallivasal or Kazimar Big Mosque is the oldest mosque in Madurai city, Tamil Nadu, India constructed in the year 1284AD (Hijri 683) and continues to be in existence for more than 7 centuries till today. The mosque was founded by Kazi Syed Tajuddin, a descendant of the Islamic prophet Muhammad, who came from Yemen during 13th century and received this land from the King Kulasekara Ku(n) Pandiyan. The mosque which was the first Muslim place of worship in Madurai.

The mosque was managed by Syed Tajuddin during his lifetime followed by his children and descendants hereditarily for more than 7 centuries till today. Almost all of Kazi Syed Tajuddin's descendants (Huqdars of this mosque called as Syeds) have lived in the same locality (Kazimar street) for more than 700 years, and have managed the mosque since then.

The mosque, which can accommodate about 1,200 people, is within 500 metres of the Periyar (central) bus stand, within one kilometre southeast of Madurai Junction railway station and 1.5 km southwest of the Meenakshi Temple.

Founder
Kazi Syed Tajuddeen is the founder of this mosque. He is son of Jamaluddin Mufti al Ma'abari who travelled to India from Yemen during 13th century. Syed Tajuddeen's elder brother Syed Alauddin settled in Kayalpatnam. He died and is buried there. Syed Tajuddeen settled in Madurai and began the construction of this mosque in the year 1281. The construction took 3 years and the mosque was opened for prayers in the year 1284. The founder of this mosque Hazrat Kazi Syed Tajuddin died on 15 Rajab 692 Hijri - March 1293AD and was interred in the large cemetery surrounding the mosque. Founder's day (Urus anniversary of Qazi Syed Tajuddin) is celebrated in this mosque every year on 15th of Rajab with great fervour.

Maqbara

Madurai Maqbara, the grave (dargah) of Madurai Hazrats (Sheikhuna Meer Ahamad Ibrahim Periya Hazrat, Sheikhuna Meer Amjad Ibrahim Chinna Hazrat and Sheikhuna Syed Abdus Salaam Ibrahim Saalim Hazrat - all descendants of Islamic Prophet Muhammad) is located inside the mosque. People from all over India and foreign visitors come here for ziyarat (spiritual visit.) The anniversary urus of Periya Hazrat is commemorated on 13th of Ramadan and Chinna Hazrat on 28th of Shawwal. Syed Abdus Salaam Ibrahim Saalim Hazrat's anniversary is celebrated on 18th of Rabiul Aakhir.

Kazis of Madurai

Syed Tajuddin was appointed as Kazi (Islamic Jury) of Madurai by the Government of Madurai Sultans and till today his descendants who live at Kazimar street, Madurai, are appointed as Kazis to the Government of Tamil Nadu. Sheikhuna Meer Ahmad Ibrahim well known as Periya was appointed as Chief Qazi (Qaziyul Quzzat) of Madurai by the government of Nawab of Arcot. As such the huqdars of this mosque have been appointed as Kazis of Madurai to the government continuously since 13th century from the period of Qazi Syed Tajuddin till today. The present government Qazi of Madurai, Moulana Moulavi A.Syed Khaja Mueenudeen is huqdar of this mosque and a descendant of Qazi Syed Tajuddin.

Imams
The founder of this mosque Kazi Syed Tajuddin himself was Imam of this mosque during his lifetime. The service of presiding the daily prayers and Friday sermons (Imamat and Qitabat) are done by the descendants of the founder Qazi Syed Tajuddin, from his period until today. The present Imams Moulavi Hafil Syed Muhammad Mueenuddeen Ibrahim and Moulavi Hafil Syed Alimullah have been in service since 1998.

Huqdars
The descendants of Kazi Syed Thajuddeen are referred as Huqdhars (Share holders) of this mosque. Today's huqdars belong to 19th and 20th generation from Qazi Syed Thajuddin. Originating from a single ancestor and having managed to live in the same locality for 7 centuries, there are around 450 Huqdars who are closely inter-related with ancestry and with matrimonial relationships. Kazimar Big mosque is being managed by the descendants of Kazi Syed Tajuddin (Huqdars) without any break since the inception of the mosque. The right to manage the mosque by the descendants of the founder of the mosque is confirmed by Tamil Nadu Waqf Board in its proforma issued in the year 1954 after surveying all the Waqf properties India Post Independence. The genealogical records of all the heirs of Kazi Syed Tajuddin and the managers of this mosque are maintained in the mosque office. All Syeds belong to the Sunni sect of Islam, its Hanafi school and most of the descendants of Kazi Syed Tajuddin are Shazulis who practice the Sufi order (Tariqa) Fassiya ash Shazuliya.

Management
All the 450 heirs of Kazi Syed Tajuddin (Syeds - Huqdars of this mosque) constitute the general body from among whom the management committee is selected. Presently, the mosque is being managed by a board of four trustees selected from, among and by the Huqdars of this mosque who are the descendants of the founder of this mosque Kazi Syed Tajuddin. Their tenure is for three years. In January 2017 the General body of huqdars of the mosque resolved to increase the seats in the management committee from four to fourteen. The earlier committee of four would be trustees and the additional committee of ten would be executive members.

Madrasa
Kazi Syed Tajuddin Arabi Madrasah is located inside the mosque campus in which around 120 students learn basic Arabic. This madrasa managed by kazimar big mosque is run by Moulavi Hafil Syed Alimullah Baqavi.

References

External links
 360 degree view of Kazimar Big Mosque and Madurai Maqbara.

Sufi shrines in India
Mosques in Madurai
Tourist attractions in Madurai
Dargahs in Tamil Nadu
Erwadi-related dargahs